Edith Elizabeth Downing (January 1857 – 3 October 1931) was a British artist, sculptor and suffragette.

Life 
Edith Elizabeth Downing was born in Cardiff in January 1857. She was one of four children of the coal merchant and shipping agent Edward Downing, having two sisters and a brother, Edward. Her sister Mary was also to become an artist, whilst sister Caroline Lowder Downing was to join the Women's Social and Political Union with Edith. After attending Cheltenham College, Edith spent most of her working life based in Chelsea. She died in October 1931 in Surrey.

Career 

Edith Downing began her artistic training at the South Kensington School of Art, later attending the Slade School of Art between 1892-1893. She was primarily a sculptor producing busts and figures in bronze and marble but she also painted watercolours and made reliefs and decorative panels. Downing first had her work exhibited at the Royal Academy in 1891 and she continued to be a regular contributor here until the early 1900s. She also exhibited at the Royal Glasgow Institute, the Paris Salon and the Society of Women Artists and was a member of the South Wales Art Society between 1896 and 1900. Several examples of Downing's work are on display at the National Museum of Wales in Cardiff including a life-size bronze figure entitled 'Avarice' on the south west staircase. An alabaster altarpiece she created as a memorial to Wilfrid Clive, who died at the age of 26 having been overcome by sulphurous volcanic fumes whilst on a visit to Dominica, can also be seen in St. Peter's Church, Wormbridge, Herefordshire. Downing also used her artistic talents to support her activities as a suffragette, both by working with her fellow artist Marion Wallace-Dunlop to organise a series of dramatic processions and by selling her work to raise funds for the movement. These included statuettes entitled 'A Sketch' and 'Peter Pan' in 1908 and statuettes of Christabel Pankhurst and Annie Kenney in 1909.

Suffragette Activity 
Edith Downing joined the Central Society for Women's Suffrage in 1903 and the London Society for Women's Suffrage in 1906. By 1908, however, she had become frustrated by the "futility of quiet work" and joined the Chelsea branch of the more radical Women's Social and Political Union (WSPU) together with her sister Caroline Lowder Downing. In June 1910 Edith and Marion Wallace-Dunlop created a 'Prisoners Tableau' for the WSPU 'Prison to Citizenship' procession whilst in the following year the two collaborated on the 'Women's Coronation Procession'. This latter procession was led by Flora Drummond on horseback and included Annan Bryce dressed as Joan of Arc and 700 women and girls clothed in white to represent suffragette prisoners. In November 1911 Downing took part in several demonstrations including one in Parliament Square which led to clashes with police and another on the 23rd of the month when she broke a window of Somerset House and was sentenced to a week in jail. She was arrested again on 1 March 1912 for throwing a stone through the window of a fine art dealers in Regent Street whilst participating in a WSPU window breaking protest with a group of about 200 organised activists, including her sister Caroline, in the West End of London. On this occasion she was sent to Holloway Prison where she joined fellow suffragettes on hunger strike and was force fed. Downing was one of the activists who spoke about the police brutality and stated that some women were prepared to die for the right to vote, she was one of the 68 women who embroidered their signatures or initials on The Suffragette Handkerchief under the noses of the prison staff. Downing was released at the end of June.

Downing had been given a Hunger Strike Medal 'for Valour' by WSPU.

References

External links

 

1857 births
1931 deaths
19th-century Welsh sculptors
20th-century Welsh sculptors
19th-century Welsh women artists
20th-century Welsh women artists
Alumni of the Slade School of Fine Art
Artists from Cardiff
Hunger Strike Medal recipients
Hunger strikers
Welsh suffragists
Welsh women sculptors
Women's Social and Political Union